Joan Oró i Florensa (October 26, 1923 in Lleida, Catalonia – September 2, 2004 in Barcelona, Catalonia) was a Spanish biochemist, whose research has been of importance in understanding the origin of life. He participated in several NASA missions, including Apollo mission to the Moon and the Viking lander. He received the Oparin Medal, awarded by the International Astrobiology Society for his contributions to the field of origins of life.

Life 
Oró completed his undergraduate studies in Biochemistry at the University of Barcelona and moved to the United States in 1952, 
due to the scarce scientific resources offered by the Spanish academia at that time. Four years later he obtained his PhD in Biochemistry 
in Houston. He became a full professor in University of Houston in 1963 where he founded and directed the department of biochemistry and biophysics. From the 1960s he worked with NASA on the Viking missions which explored the planet Mars. His work was essential in the analysis of samples of Martian soil, questioning early suggestions that life might have been detected. He was also involved in political life after Spain's transition to democracy as member of the Parliament of Catalonia. He also served as a science advisor for many USA projects and committees, including those involved in the International Space Station and the future missions to Mars.

Origins of life 
One of his most important contributions was the prebiotic synthesis of the nucleobase adenine (a key component of nucleic acids) from hydrogen cyanide (HCN). He also showed that amino acids can be made from HCN plus ammonia in an aqueous solution. This was achieved during the period 1959–1962 and stands, together with the Miller-Urey experiment, as one of the fundamental results of prebiotic chemistry. It opened up a research area eventually leading to the complete synthesis of other components of nucleic acids.

Cometary origin of prebiotic molecules 
He was also the first scientist pointing towards comets as key carriers of organic molecules to our early biosphere. This conjecture (formulated in 1961) is broadly accepted today.  Although such an idea had been around for a long time, it was only when both space exploration and prebiotic chemistry fully developed that extensive evidence was in place. Comets are rich in carbon and water, bearing along precursor molecules based on carbon chemistry, such as amino acids. In this context, in 1971, Oró and co-workers published a paper revealing the high abundance of amino acids, aliphatic and
aromatic hydrocarbons in the Murchison meteorite and studied the optical activity of the amino acids.

Viking mission 
Oró also provided a chemical interpretation of a set of remarkable, and to some extent unexpected results reported by the Viking mission to Mars. 
The Viking lander performed a series of experiments, including one designed by Oró, involving a small gas chromatograph and mass spectrometer. In one of these experiments, where a set of nutrients was mixed with Martian soil samples, a sudden production of carbon dioxide was reported, initially suggesting the presence of Martian microbes, which would have shown some kind of metabolic processing of nutrients. Oró showed that a simpler, abiotic interpretation was more likely to be the correct one: the catalytic chemical oxidation of test nutrients.

Awards 
He was awarded, among other honors, the Cross of Civil Order of Alfonso X el Sabio (Madrid, 1983), the Alexander Ivanovich Oparin Medal Award from the International Society for the Study of the Origin of Life (ISSOL) (Berkeley, 1986), the Creu de Sant Jordi (1991), and the Medalla del President Francesc Macià (2000).

He was named Marquess of Oró in 2003 by Royal Decree 819-32003 of 23 June.

He died in Barcelona, Catalonia, Spain, on September 2, 2004.

References

External links
Joan Oró Foundation

|-

1923 births
2004 deaths
Scientists from Catalonia
Spanish biochemists
People from Lleida
Astrobiologists